Sırt Çiçi (also, Sirt Çiçi, Sirk Çiçi, and Syrt Chichi) is a village in the Quba Rayon of Azerbaijan.  The village forms part of the municipality of Səbətlər.

References

External links

Populated places in Quba District (Azerbaijan)